Panagiotis Gionis (born 7 January 1980) is a Greek table tennis player and a dentist. He is a member in the Greece National Team and has competed in 4 Olympics and many World and European Championships. He has been playing professionally in Germany and France since 2001. Currently, he is playing for Greek club Panathinaikos, German club Borussia Düsseldorf and is being sponsored by TAMASU BUTTERFLY.

In May 2011, he qualified directly for the London 2012 Summer Olympics based on his ITTF world ranking.  At the 2012 Summer Olympics, he lost in the third round to Japan's Seiya Kishikawa.

He placed 3rd in the men's single 2013 LIEBHERR European Championships and second in the team event. He is currently ranked 21st in the world and 7th in Europe.

In Aug 2014 he was invited to participate in the mixed European team in the Asia-Europe All Star Challenge on 1–2 November 2014 in Zhang Jia Gang, China. He lost to Chuang Chih-yuan with 0:3.

In April 2016, he secured his spot at the 2016 Summer Olympics by winning the group final match at the ITTF European Olympic Games Qualification Tournament in Halmstad, Sweden. At the 2016 Summer Olympics, he defeated Padasak Tanviriyavechakul of Thailand in the second round. He was defeated by Jun Mizutani of Japan in the third round.

Panagiotis Gionis qualified for the 2017 World Table Tennis Championships seeded at Number 29. In the first round and second round he faced and defeated North Korea's Choe Il (4–2) and Slovakia's Wang Yang (4–3) respectively. Gionis was ultimately defeated in the third round by Number 12 seed, Vladimir Samsonov, (0–4).

In 2021, he participated in the Tokyo Summer Olympics, ultimately losing to Jeong Youngsik in the 3rd round after beating Ahmed Saleh 4–1.

Achievements 
 Winner Croatia Open Singles 2018
 Winner Croatia Open Singles 2017
 5x Olympic Games Participant (2020 Tokyo, 2016 Rio, 2012 London, 2008 Beijing, 2004 Athens)
 16x Participant World Championships 1997–2014
 15x Participant European Championships 1997–2013
 Finalist European Championships Team 2013
 Bronze Medal European Championships Singles 2013 
 Bronze Medal European Champions league (with Angers) 2013
 Bronze Medal ITTF World Tour, Swedish Open Singles 2013
 Bronze Medal European Cup Top 16 Singles 2015
 Round of 16 European Championships Singles 2012
 Round of 16 European Championships Doubles 2012
 Finalist ETTU Cup (with Angers) 2012
 Round of 16 Hungarian Open Singles 2012
 Winner Pescara Mediterranean Games Singles 2009
 Round of 16 World Championships Singles 2009
 Gold medal Belgian Open Championship Singles 2006
 Winner Luxemburg Open Singles 2006
 Winner Luxemburg Open Team 2006
 Bronze Medal Swedish Pro Tour Doubles 2005
 Silver Medal Polish Open Doubles 2004
 Silver Medal Belgian Open Championship 2004
 Bronze Medal Egypt Pro Tour Doubles 2004
 Winner Bulgarian Open 2003
 6th place World Championship Team 1997
 1st place in Men's U21 Balkan Championship Doubles 1996
 1st place in U21 European Championship Singles 1996
 1st place in U21 Balkan Championship Singles 1996
 1st place in U15 Balkan Championship Singles 1992

See also 
 List of table tennis players

References

External links
 
 
 
 
 

1980 births
Living people
Olympic table tennis players of Greece
Table tennis players at the 2004 Summer Olympics
Table tennis players at the 2008 Summer Olympics
Table tennis players at the 2012 Summer Olympics
Table tennis players at the 2016 Summer Olympics
European Games competitors for Greece
Table tennis players at the 2015 European Games
Greek dentists
Greek male table tennis players
Mediterranean Games gold medalists for Greece
Competitors at the 2009 Mediterranean Games
Mediterranean Games medalists in table tennis
Table tennis players at the 2019 European Games
Sportspeople from Athens
Expatriate table tennis people in Japan
Table tennis players at the 2020 Summer Olympics
Panathinaikos table tennis players